Pleasant Grove is a city in western Jefferson County, Alabama. It is part of the Birmingham metropolitan area. Its nickname is "The Good Neighbor City". At the 2020 census, the population was 9,544.

History
It was established in 1889, but incorporated as a city in January 1937. The incorporation came about by reason of a rather unusual circumstance. The town sits on land honeycombed by coal mines. For many years, the residents had relied on water wells for their water supply. As years passed and more mining was done, Pleasant Grove found itself confronted with a problem. Residents would sometimes go to their well to draw water only to find there was none. The water had gone into the mines.

During the mid to late 1930s, the Federal Government had a program for financing the building of local water systems. In exploring the possibility of securing such funds, it was revealed that in order to secure such financing a community must be legally incorporated. At this time the incorporation became a reality.

The first appointed Mayor of Pleasant Grove was W.P. Stone. The city is governed by a mayor and five council members who serve four-year terms. Elections for city officials is held during the summer of each leap year with four-year terms beginning the first Monday in October. The area known as Pleasant Grove, Alabama was first homesteaded in September 1836. Pleasant Grove is in Jefferson County. Although no one seems to know when or exactly how the town came by its name, old documents indicate that at least part of this area was called Pleasant Grove as early as 1884. Pleasant Grove was made up of four communities which included Frog Pond, Lizard Ridge, Cottage Hill, and Pleasant Grove.

The city was damaged by large tornadoes in 1956, 1977, 1998, and 2011.

Government
The city is governed by a mayor, currently Jerry Brasseale, and five-member council. All city officials are elected to four-year terms on leap years. The council meets the first and third Monday of each month at Pleasant Grove City Hall. Council members as of 2020 include Yolanda Lawson, Philip Houston, Ken Hatfield, Kevin Dunn, and Ray Lassiter.

Geography

Pleasant Grove is home to Milk Creek, so named for its creamy-white color and thick, calcious texture.

Education
Pleasant Grove Schools are operated by the Jefferson County Board of Education. Land was originally given to the Board of Education and a gift of $150,000 toward the construction of a Junior High School. In 1970, Pleasant Grove High School was built. It  combined with the Junior High School. The schools were accredited by the State of Alabama in May 1973. It agreed to give the Board of Education $1,00 over a ten-year period to add onto the existing Elementary School and get all of the children K-6 under one roof. In January 1997, students who formerly attended Woodward School were relocated to the city.

Construction of a new Pleasant Grove High School was completed in 2010. Pleasant Grove High School has the highest graduation rate in the Jefferson County School system. There are four Nationally Certified teachers on staff, and the remainder of the staff is highly qualified as per Alabama Board of Education standards.  The old high school is now the JCIB Middle School.

Demographics

2000 census
At the 2000 census, there were 9,983 people, 3,570 households, and 2,909 families living in the city. The racial makeup of the city was 84.67% White, 14.44% Black or African American, 0.19% Native American, 0.15% Asian, 0.16% from other races, and 0.38% from two or more races. Hispanic or Latino of any race were 0.28% of the population.

Of the 3,570 households 37.8% had children under the age of 18 living with them, 70.7% were married couples living together, 8.3% had a female householder with no husband present, and 18.5% were non-families. 17.4% of households were one person and 9.6% were one person aged 65 or older. The average household size was 2.72 and the average family size was 3.08.

The age distribution was 24.4% under the age of 18, 7.1% from 18 to 24, 27.0% from 25 to 44, 25.6% from 45 to 64, and 15.8% 65 or older. The median age was 40 years. For every 100 females, there were 90.2 males. For every 100 females age 18 and over, there were 86.6 males.

The median household income was $52,776 and the median family income  was $59,132. Males had a median income of $38,544 versus $28,519 for females. The per capita income for the city was $20,774. About 3.2% of families and 3.8% of the population were below the poverty line, including 4.2% of those under age 18 and 4.4% of those age 65 or over.

2010 census
At the 2010 census, there were 10,110 people, 3,715 households, and 2,857 families living in the city. The racial makeup of the city was 53.7% White, 44.8% Black or African American, 0.3% Native American, 0.2% Asian, 0.2% from other races, and 0.7% from two or more races. Hispanic or Latino of any race were 0.6% of the population.

Of the 3,715 households 32.1% had children under the age of 18 living with them, 58.4% were married couples living together, 14.4% had a female householder with no husband present, and 23.1% were non-families. 21.0% of households were one person and 9.8% were one person aged 65 or older. The average household size was 2.67 and the average family size was 3.09.

The age distribution was 23.8% under the age of 18, 7.7% from 18 to 24, 23.2% from 25 to 44, 30.1% from 45 to 64, and 15.1% 65 or older. The median age was 41.2 years. For every 100 females, there were 90.9 males. For every 100 females age 18 and over, there were 92.1 males.

The median household income was $66,681 and the median family income  was $72,341. Males had a median income of $45,587 versus $40,830 for females. The per capita income for the city was $26,833. About 2.8% of families and 2.0% of the population were below the poverty line, including .5% of those under age 18 and 2.6% of those age 65 or over.

2020 census

As of the 2020 United States census, there were 9,544 people, 3,610 households, and 2,656 families residing in the city.

Notable people
R. G. Armstrong, actor and playwright
James Bradberry, cornerback for the New York Giants
Jake Elmore, Major League Baseball Player currently in the Pittsburgh Pirates organization

References

External links
City website

Cities in Alabama
Cities in Jefferson County, Alabama
Birmingham metropolitan area, Alabama
Populated places established in 1889